Pati Behrs Eristoff  (February 13, 1922 – July 4, 2004) was a Russian American prima ballerina and actress.

Biography
Pati Behrs Eristoff was a prima ballerina and a grandniece of Leo Tolstoy. She is perhaps best known as the first of John Derek's wives. She was born in Turkey to Russian émigré parents. Her family fled to Paris after her father refused to partake in pogroms. She survived World War II and Occupied France by dancing in Parisian nightclubs, while at the same time doing all she could to hide Russian Jews and gypsies from the Nazis.

Receiving a Hollywood contract after the war, she emigrated to the United States. Behrs had a brief first marriage to George 'Gogi' Tchitchinadze (1917–1970), a host at the Bel-Air Hotel.

In December 1947 she met John Derek in an acting class, and they married on October 9, 1948. The couple had two children: son Russell Derek (1950–1999) and daughter Sean Catherine Derek (born 1953), who became a screenwriter. Behrs and Derek separated in September 1955 and divorced in April 1956.

In 1975, she married pediatrician Dr. Lucius Lindley (1919–1986), who predeceased her.

She became a grandmother in 1969, and a great-grandmother in 1996. She died on July 4, 2004, aged 82.

Philosophical and/or political views
An animal-rights advocate, she presented  Actors and Others with her 1926 Steinway baby grand piano. Her daughter, Sean, requested it be sold to help as many animals in need as possible.

Filmography

See also

 List of people from California
 List of prima ballerinas
 List of Russian people

References

External links
 
 

2004 deaths
1922 births
20th-century American actresses
Actresses from California
American ballerinas
American film actresses
Turkish emigrants to France
French emigrants to the United States
Leo Tolstoy
Dancers from Paris
Prima ballerinas
20th-century American ballet dancers